Sphaerellothecium is a genus of fungi in the family Phyllachoraceae. All of the species in the genus are lichenicolous, meaning they grow parasitically on lichens.

Species
Sphaerellothecium abditum 
Sphaerellothecium aculeatae  – Ukraine
Sphaerellothecium aipoliae 
Sphaerellothecium araneosum 
Sphaerellothecium arctoparmeliae 
Sphaerellothecium arnoldii 
Sphaerellothecium atryneae 
Sphaerellothecium breussii 
Sphaerellothecium buelliae 
Sphaerellothecium cinerascens 
Sphaerellothecium cladoniae 
Sphaerellothecium cladoniicola 
Sphaerellothecium coniodes 
Sphaerellothecium contextum 
Sphaerellothecium epilecanora 
Sphaerellothecium episoralium 
Sphaerellothecium episquamarinae 
Sphaerellothecium gallowayi 
Sphaerellothecium giraltiae 
Sphaerellothecium gowardii 
Sphaerellothecium heterodermiae  – Portugal
Sphaerellothecium icmadophilae 
Sphaerellothecium leratianum 
Sphaerellothecium minutum  – Norway
Sphaerellothecium pannariacearum 
Sphaerellothecium parietinarium 
Sphaerellothecium parmeliae 
Sphaerellothecium parmotrematis  – Portugal
Sphaerellothecium phaeorrhizae 
Sphaerellothecium propinquellum 
Sphaerellothecium reticulatum 
Sphaerellothecium siphulae  – Arctic
Sphaerellothecium soechtingii 
Sphaerellothecium stereocaulorum 
Sphaerellothecium subtile 
Sphaerellothecium taimyricum 
Sphaerellothecium thamnoliae 
Sphaerellothecium usneicola

References

Sordariomycetes genera
Dothideomycetes genera
Taxa named by Friedrich Wilhelm Zopf
Lichenicolous fungi